Gymnoscelis bassa is a moth in the family Geometridae. It is found in Cameroon.

References

Endemic fauna of Cameroon
Moths described in 1981
Gymnoscelis
Insects of Cameroon
Moths of Africa